Vašo Patejdl (born Václav Patejdl on 10 October 1954) is a Slovak musician and composer originally from Karlovy Vary.

He is one of the founding members of the pop-rock band Elán.

Selected works

with Elán

Solo
Musicals
 Jozef a jeho zázračný farebný plášť (Joseph and the Amazing Technicolor Dreamcoat) (Prague, 1994)
 Grand Pierrot (Prague, 1995)
 Adam Šangala (Prague, 2003)
 Jack Rozparovač (Prague, 2006)

Collaborations
 Voľné miesto v srdci by Marika Gombitová (1986)
 Ateliér duše by Marika Gombitová (1987)
 Slávnosť úprimných slov with Marika Gombitová, Janko Lehotský, and Richard Müller (1987)
 Zostaň by Marika Gombitová (1993)
 Good Vibes: Remixes by Double L & Vinyl Culture (1997)

References

1954 births
Living people